Together with the Union was an electoral alliance in Italy that contested seats in the senate for the 2006 general election. The alliance consisted of:
Federation of the Greens
Party of Italian Communists
United Consumers

The alliance received 4.09% of the votes and 11 seats in the senate. It contested in the election as part of The Union.

References

Defunct political party alliances in Italy